Tadeusz Bielecki (born 30 January 1901 in Słupia – 5 February 1982 in London) was a Polish politician and writer. Personal secretary to Roman Dmowski, member of the National Party (Stronnictwo Narodowe) and Camp of Great Poland (Obóz Wielkiej Polski); he was however opposed to radicals from National Radical Camp (Obóz Narodowo-Radykalny). He fought in the Polish September Campaign, then escaped occupied Poland to join the National Council of Poland. He was a vocal opponent of Władysław Sikorski's policies in the Polish government in exile. After the war he remained in emigration, where he was a member of the Political Council and the Council of National Unity.

References 

1901 births
1982 deaths
People from Kielce Governorate
National League (Poland) members
Camp of Great Poland politicians
National Party (Poland) politicians
Members of the Sejm of the Second Polish Republic (1930–1935)
Polish exiles
Polish people of the Polish–Soviet War
Polish military personnel of World War II
People from Jędrzejów County